KBKB (1360 kHz) is an AM radio station serving the communities of Fort Madison, Burlington, and Keokuk, Iowa.  The station primarily broadcasts a sports format, airing programming from Fox Sports Radio, including Colin Cowherd and JT The Brick.  KBKB is owned by Pritchard Broadcasting Corporation. It was first licensed on January 10, 1949.

Pritchard Broadcasting Corporation (owned by John T. Pritchard) agreed to purchase the station from GAP West (owned by Skip Weller) in late 2007.  The station was owned by Clear Channel prior to GAP West.

References

External links
KBKB official website

FCC History Cards for KBKB

BKB
Sports radio stations in the United States
Radio stations established in 2007